Judas is the seventh studio album by the American heavy metal band Fozzy, released on October 13, 2017, through Century Media Records. The album's title track was released as the lead single from the album on May 5, 2017. Ahead of the album release, two additional songs were made available on streaming services: "Drinkin' with Jesus" on September 15, 2017, and "Painless" on September 29, 2017.

The lead single was a minor radio hit, spending 26 weeks on the Mainstream Rock chart and peaking at No. 5. The song also hit No. 1  on the Sirius/XM Octane charts. "Judas" was the official theme song for NXT TakeOver: Chicago and lead singer Chris Jericho uses the song as his entrance theme for his appearances in New Japan Pro-Wrestling and All Elite Wrestling. "Painless" was the official theme song for NXT TakeOver: Chicago II the following year.

Track listing

Charts

References

Fozzy albums
2017 albums
Century Media Records albums